Creamer may refer to:
 Creamer (vessel), a small pitcher or jug designed for holding cream or milk
 Creamer potato, a subtype of potato cultivar
 Non-dairy creamer, a cream substitute used with coffee or tea
 "Creamer (Radio is Dead)", a song by Limp Bizkit on their 2003 album Results May Vary
 "Non-Dairy Creamer", a single by Third Eye Blind from the EP Red Star
 , a United States Navy destroyer escort launched in 1944 but never completed

People

 Chris Creamer, Canadian website owner of SportsLogos.net
 David S. Creamer (1858–1946) was an Ohio politician. He was state treasurer from 1909 to 1913 and state fire marshal
 George Creamer (1855–1886), American Major League Baseball second baseman from Philadelphia, Pennsylvania
 Henry Creamer (1879–1930), American popular song lyricist, and part of the songwriting team of Creamer & Layton
 John Creamer (born ?), an international disc jockey; see John Creamer & Stephane K
 Lucy Creamer (born 1971), Champion rock climber
 Marvin Creamer (1916–2020), former college professor and amateur American sailor noted for having sailed around the globe without the aid of navigational instruments
 Matthew Creamer (born ?), award-winning American journalist who reports on marketing, advertising, media, and pop culture and is an editor-at-large at Advertising Age magazine
 Patrick D. Creamer (1892-1949), American politician
 Paula Creamer (born 1986), American golfer
 Peter Creamer (born 1953), English former professional footballer who played as a defender
 Pierre Creamer (born 1944), former Canadian ice hockey coach
 Robert Creamer (1922–2012), American journalist and author
 Robert Creamer (political consultant) (born 1947), American political consultant
 Sandra Creamer (born 1961) Australian lawyer and Indigenous peoples' rights advocate
 Thomas J. Creamer (1843–1914), American politician
 Timothy Creamer (born 1959), NASA astronaut and a Colonel in the United States Army
 William W. Creamer (1916–1942), United States Navy officer and Navy Cross recipient

See also
 Cream (disambiguation)